Rick Kulacz (born 27 June 1985) is an Australian professional golfer.

Career
Kulacz turned professional in 2007 and has played on the PGA Tour of Australasia, Asian Tour, and European Tour. He has won twice on the Asian Tour.
He obtained full playing rights on the European Tour via the 2009 Qualifying School, where he sunk a putt in excess of 50 feet on his final hole of regulation play to gain full playing rights by 1 stroke.

Kulacz qualified for the 2011 Open Championship in dramatic fashion by taking the third and final spot in the Australasia International Qualifier in a playoff against Stephen Leaney at Kingston Heath Golf Club, Melbourne, Australia.

Amateur wins
2001 Australian Boys' Amateur
2007 Scratch Players Championship

Professional wins (3)

Asian Tour wins (2)

Asian Tour playoff record (1–0)

Von Nida Tour wins (1)

Team appearancesAmateur'''
Nomura Cup (representing Australia): 2007 (winners)
Sloan Morpeth Trophy (representing Australia): 2007

See also
2009 European Tour Qualifying School graduates

External links

Rick Kulacz player profile at GolfAustralia.org.au

Australian male golfers
PGA Tour of Australasia golfers
Asian Tour golfers
European Tour golfers
1985 births
Living people